Goonhusband is a hamlet in the parish of Helston, Cornwall, England.

References

Hamlets in Cornwall